Bruce Myles (born 29 November 1940) is an Australian actor and film director. He has appeared in 40 films and television shows since 1963. In 1987, along with Michael Pattinson, he co-directed the film Ground Zero. It was entered into the 38th Berlin International Film Festival.

In 2004 he adapted The Call, Martin Flanagan's 1998 novel about cricketer and Australian rules football pioneer Tom Wills, into a stage play.

Filmography

References

External links

1940 births
Living people
Australian male film actors
Australian film directors
Male actors from Sydney